Berita RTM (stylised as BERITA rtm), also known as Saluran Berita RTM, or BES (Berita Ehwal Semasa) is a free-to-air Malaysian television network owned and operated by Radio Televisyen Malaysia (RTM). With 'Yang Sahih di Berita RTM' (Trustworthy at RTM News) as its corporate slogan, the network is headquartered at the Wisma Berita RTM in Angkasapuri and was launched on 25 June 2020 alongside its television channel at 7.45 pm (MST) and broadcast via myFreeview channel 123. It broadcasts specialised news covering of current affairs and talk shows in high definition (HD). Berita RTM channel broadcast 24 hours a day covering a wide range of languages, mainly in Malay, English, Mandarin and Tamil in addition to East Malaysian languages: Iban, Kadazan, Dusun and Bajau.

The network offers 25 daily news slots, 12 talk shows a week, five days of business news and two weekly magazine programs. The dynamic transformation of the new channel also offers a variety of features compared to other TV channels as it broadcasts its multimedia news from 12 noon to 2 pm followed by 7 pm to 9 pm. The launching of the network was officiated by Minister of Communications and Multimedia, Saifuddin Abdullah as part of government’s initiative to counter the so-called "fake news".

The channel is live-streamed on RTM's streaming service, RTM Klik, and on Youtube.

Programming
Berita RTM focusing on news and news-related programs broadcast 24 hours daily in 4 languages: Malay, English, Mandarin and Tamil. The channel offers 25 daily news slots, 12 talk shows a week, five business news days and two weekly magazine programs that contribute to the empowerment of the public with a wealth of information.  The channel also simulcasts news programmes originally targeted at TV1 and TV2 viewers. The network also allows viewers to watch multi-language radio news broadcasts as well as live broadcasts from RTM radio stations across the country which also discuss specific issues at the state level. One of the network’s TV programmes is Pastikan Sahih (Ensure Trustworthy), a TV program aimed to combatting viral fake news. It aired at 6.30 pm Weekdays.

Beginning 1 April 2021, RTM's 75th anniversary, East Malaysian language news (Iban, Kadazan, Dusun and Bajau) are also available on the channel besides on sister channel TV Okey.

Beginning 14 February 2023, RTM airs both the morning and evening parliamentary sessions live on the channel.

See also
 Astro Awani
 Bernama TV

References

External links
 
 
 
 

2020 establishments in Malaysia
Radio Televisyen Malaysia
Television stations in Malaysia
24-hour television news channels in Malaysia
Television channels and stations established in 2020
Multilingual news services